Eliezer Yotvat (1931-2012) was the first Israeli Ambassador to Azerbaijan from 1993 until 1996.

References

1931 births
2012 deaths
Ambassadors of Israel to Azerbaijan